Pat Brady may refer to:

 Pat Brady (actor) (1914–1972), best known as the "comical sidekick" to Roy Rogers
 Pat Brady (cartoonist) (born 1947), American cartoonist and creator of Rose Is Rose
 Pat Brady (footballer) (born 1936), Irish footballer who played in England
 Pat Brady (gridiron football) (1926–2009), American gridiron football quarterback and punter
 Pat Brady (politician), American politician from Illinois